The 1991 Idaho Vandals football team represented the University of Idaho in the 1991 NCAA Division I-AA football season. The Vandals were led by third-year head coach John L. Smith, were members of the Big Sky Conference and played their home games at the Kibbie Dome, an indoor facility on campus in Moscow, Idaho.

The Vandals missed the I-AA playoffs for the first time since 1984. The Vandals defeated rival Boise State for the tenth consecutive season.

Schedule

References

External links
 Gem of the Mountains: 1992 University of Idaho yearbook – 1991 football season
 Idaho Argonaut – student newspaper – 1991 editions

Idaho
Idaho Vandals football seasons
Big Sky Conference football champion seasons
Idaho Vandals football